Acciari is a surname. Notable people with the surname include:

José Acciari (born 1978), Argentine footballer and manager
Noel Acciari (born 1991), American ice hockey player